Chapati (alternatively spelled chapatti, chappati, chapathi, or chappathi;), also known as roti, rooti, rotli,  rotta, safati, shabaati, phulka, (in East Africa) chapo, (in Marathi) poli, and (in the Maldives) roshi, is an unleavened flatbread originating from the Indian subcontinent and staple in India, Nepal, Bangladesh, Pakistan, Sri Lanka, East Africa, Arabian Peninsula and the Caribbean. Chapatis are made of whole-wheat flour known as atta, mixed into dough with water, oil (optional), salt (optional) in a mixing utensil called a parat, and are cooked on a tava (flat skillet).

It is a common staple in the Indian subcontinent as well as amongst expatriates from the Indian subcontinent throughout the world. Chapatis were also introduced to other parts of the world by immigrants from the Indian subcontinent, particularly by Indian merchants to Central Asia, Southeast Asia, East Africa, and the Caribbean islands.

Etymology 
The word Chapati is derived from Sanskrit word चर्पटी (Charpaṭī).

History

Chapati is a form of roti or rotta (bread). The words are often used interchangeably. The word chapat means "slap" or "flat," describing the traditional method of forming round pieces of thin dough by slapping the dough between the wetted palms of the hands. With each slap, the piece of dough is rotated. 

Word Chapati is noted in the 16th-century document Ain-i-Akbari  by Abu'l-Fazl ibn Mubarak, vizier of Mughal Emperor Akbar.

Chapatis are one of the most common forms of wheat bread, a staple food in the Indian subcontinent. The carbonized wheat grains discovered at the excavations at Mohenjo-daro are of a similar variety to an endemic species of wheat still to be found in India today. The Indus Valley is known to be one of the ancestral lands of cultivated wheat. 

Chapatis, along with rotis, were introduced to other parts of the world by immigrants from the Indian subcontinent, particularly by Indian merchants who settled in Southeast Asia and the Caribbean islands.

Cooking

Chapatis are made using a soft dough comprising wheat flour, salt and water. It is more finely ground than most western-style whole wheat flours.

Chapati dough is typically prepared with flour, salt and water, kneaded with the knuckles of the hand made into a fist and left to rest for at least 10 or 15 minutes to an hour for the gluten in the dough to relax. After proofing, the dough becomes softer and more pliable. Small portions of the dough are pinched off and formed into round balls that are pressed between the two palms to form discs which are then dipped into flour and rolled out on a circular rolling board (a chakla), using a rolling pin known as a velan or belan, into a flat disc. There are also automatic roti makers which automate the whole process.

The rolled-out dough is then thrown on the preheated dry tava and cooked on both sides. In some regions of the Indian subcontinent chapatis are only partially cooked on the skillet, and then cooked directly over a flame, which makes them puff up. The hot steam cooks the chapati rapidly from the inside. In some parts of northern India and eastern Pakistan, this is called a phulka. In southern parts of India, it is called a pulka. It is also possible to puff up the roti directly on the tava. Once cooked, chapatis are often topped with butter or ghee. In western regions of Maharashtra, some oil is added inside rolled out dough and then put on tava, this is distinct from paratha.

Chapati diameter and thickness vary from region to region. Tavas were traditionally made of unglazed earthenware, but are now typically made from metal. The shape of the rolling pin also varies from region to region. Some households simply use a kitchen worktop as a sort of pastry board, but round flat-topped "boards" made of wood, stone, or stainless steel are available specifically for rolling out chapatis.

In most parts of the Indian subcontinent, there is a distinction made between a chapati and other related flatbreads eaten in the region like roti, paratha, kulcha, puri and naan based on cooking technique, texture and use of different types of flours. For example, parathas are either made layered by spreading with ghee, folding and rolling out again into a disc which turns out flakey once cooked or is filled with spinach, dal or cooked radish or potato. Parathas are mostly made using all-purpose flour instead of whole wheat flour.

There are many regional varieties of chapati in India.

 Paneer chapati: Grated paneer is added to the usual chapati dough which is also called 'paneer paratha'.
 Radish/mullangi chapati: Grated radish and turmeric powder is added to the dough and the chapati is usually thick. It is often eaten by lorry drivers who eat in roadside dhabas during long trips. It is also called 'mooli paratha'.
 Vegetable-stuffed chapati: Mashed carrot, potato, peas, and fenugreek are slightly sautéed into a masala gravy. These chapatis are usually served rolled, and many households prepare them using their own combinations of available vegetables.

The Aloo paratha (Chapati stuffed with boiled Potato and onions) is very famous in Northern parts of India especially New Delhi, Punjab and hilly areas of Shimla. It is eaten along with Pickle and Curd. In winters there are two more varieties of Parathas i.e. the Gobhi Paratha (Chapati stuffed with Cauliflower) and Mooli Paratha (Chapati Stuffed with Raddish).

In the Maldives, chapatis are traditionally eaten for breakfast along with a dish known as mas huni.

The Indian breads are tasty and equally nutritious. Flatbreads are staples of Indian food. Chapatis go well with curries, dry sabjis, chutneys or dal.

Gallery

See also

 List of Indian breads
 List of Pakistani breads
 Indian bread
 Blintz
 Chakla
 Chimta
 Crêpe
 Crispbread
 Khubz
 Lavash
 Markook
 Matzo
 Naan
 Pancake
 Paratha
 Pita
 Poori
 Saj bread
 Tortilla
 Tunnbröd

References

Andhra cuisine
Articles containing video clips
Bangladeshi cuisine
Bengali cuisine
Bihari cuisine
Burmese cuisine
Flatbreads
Indian breads
Indian cuisine
Indonesian breads
Karnataka cuisine
Malaysian breads
Mauritian cuisine
Muhajir cuisine
Nepalese cuisine
Pakistani breads
Punjabi cuisine
Roti
Singaporean cuisine
Tamil cuisine
Telangana cuisine
Trinidad and Tobago cuisine
Uttar Pradeshi cuisine
Gujarati cuisine
Kutchi cuisine
Maharashtrian cuisine
Jharkhandi cuisine